David Schiaffino (28 May 1913 – 16 December 2005) was an Argentine sports shooter. He competed at the 1948 Summer Olympics and 1952 Summer Olympics.

References

1913 births
2005 deaths
Argentine male sport shooters
Olympic shooters of Argentina
Shooters at the 1948 Summer Olympics
Shooters at the 1952 Summer Olympics
Pan American Games gold medalists for Argentina
Pan American Games silver medalists for Argentina
Pan American Games bronze medalists for Argentina
Pan American Games medalists in shooting
Place of birth missing
Shooters at the 1951 Pan American Games
Shooters at the 1963 Pan American Games
Medalists at the 1951 Pan American Games